The Battle of Chương Dương (1285) was a battle between joint Cham–Vietnamese forces led by Prince Trần Quốc Tuấn and Duke Trần Quang Khải against the Mongol-led Yuan force under the Mongol general Sogetu in late June 1285. The battle took place at the Chương Dương port (modern-day Thường Tín District, Hanoi) on the Red River. Most of the Yuan warships were burned and sunk while Sogetu was killed in battle.

References 

Vietnam
Invasions of Vietnam
Chương Dương
Chương Dương
Chương Dương
Chương Dương
13th century in Vietnam
1285 in the Mongol Empire
1285 in Asia
History of Hanoi